The Military ranks of Papua New Guinea are the military insignia used by the Papua New Guinea Defence Force. With its military originating from the Australian Army, Papua New Guinea shares a rank structure similar to that of Australia.

Commissioned officer ranks
The rank insignia of commissioned officers.

Other ranks
The rank insignia of non-commissioned officers and enlisted personnel.

References

External links
 

Military of Papua New Guinea